The 1964 Harrow Council election took place on 7 May 1964 to elect members of Harrow London Borough Council in London, England. The whole council was up for election and the Conservative party gained control of the council.

Background
These elections were the first to the newly formed borough. Previously elections had taken place in the Municipal Borough of Harrow. This borough formed the new London Borough of Harrow by the London Government Act 1963.

A total of 168 candidates stood in the election for the 56 seats being contested across 15 wards. These included a full slate from the Conservative and Labour parties, while the Liberals stood 50 candidates. Other candidates included 6 from the Communist party. There were 7 three-seat wards, 5 four-seat wards and 3 five-seat wards.

This election had aldermen as well as directly elected councillors.  The Conservatives got 6 aldermen and Labour 3.

The Council was elected in 1964 as a "shadow authority" but did not start operations until 1 April 1965.

Election result
The results saw the Conservatives gain the new council with a majority of 16 after winning 36 of the 56 seats. Overall turnout in the election was 43.0%. This turnout included 793 postal votes.

Ward results

References

1964
1964 London Borough council elections